Marina Manishi is a 1970 Indian Telugu-language action-drama film co-written and directed by C. S. Rao. It stars N. T. Rama Rao and Vijaya Nirmala, with music composed by T. V. Raju.

Plot 
The film begins with Raju (N. T. Rama Rao) a pickpocket, stealing a diamond necklace. On his way back, a notorious burglar Rangoon Ranganna (Satyanarayana) snatches it from him. Raju lives with his mother Lakshmamma (Hemalatha), who does not know his reality. Ranganna has another shade, as a respectable person Bhupathi, proprietor of Hotel Prince. After some time, Raju locates the necklace on Tara's (Jyothi Lakshmi) neck, Bhupathi's elder brother's daughter, and asks her to give it back. From then on, she starts loving him, but he doesn't love her. Meanwhile, Hotel Prince Manager Murthy (Ramakrishna), leads a happy family life with his wife Janaki (Manimala), a child, his mother Rajamma (Malathi), and sister Gauri (Vijaya Nirmala). They live in their village and as Murthy has made an intercaste marriage, he maintains secrecy. Meanwhile, Bhupathi does a bank robbery, which Murthy senses, but keeps quiet due to fear. Once Gauri visits the city to meet Murthy to talk regarding the debt on their house when Raju steals her purse. At the same time, she is kidnapped by goons, Raju rescues her and safely sends her to Murthy. Then, both of them fall in love. Murthy sends Gauri back and asks for a loan from Bhupathi, but crooked Bhupathi gives him fake currency which he has stolen from the bank. Murthy reaches the post office to send the money which is again stolen by Raju. Shocked, Murthy dies of a heart attack. When Raju opens the cover he understands their pathetic situation and immediately rushes to Murthy's house where he spots Murthy's dead body. Here Raju recognizes his sins, reaches their village, and clears the debt when he learns Gauri is Murthy's sister and also that they do not know about Murthy's marriage. After that, Raju nearly dies out of contrition when a saint Baba (V. Nagayya), tells him to dedicate his life to those people as a penance for his sins. Now Raju moves in search of Murthy's family when Janaki is trying to commit suicide, Raju protects, keeps them in Baba's Ashram, completely reforms, and rides a cycle Rickshaw for his livelihood. On the other side, Seenaiah (Allu Ramalingaiah) the money lender gives the police a complaint that the money is fake currency, Bhupathi cleverly throws the blame on Raju, and Police are behind him. Eventually, Rajamma and Gauri land in the city to meet Murthy, they get acquainted with Lakshmamma and she brings them to her house. At that moment, she finds out that Raju is her son and immediately leaves that place, accusing Raju as a thief. Afterward, when Lakshamma questions Raju then he admits his mistake, and distressed Lakshamma commits suicide. Eventually, Bhupathi takes Rajamma and Gauri into his custody, orders his henchmen to kill Rajamma, and tries to molest Gauri. Raju protects her when she understands his virtue. Simultaneously, Rajamma is saved by Janaki when she knows the truth regarding her son. Raju too reaches there along with Gauri, confesses his crime and everyone starts hating him. In that situation, Baba guides him to prove his innocence, then everything gets set right. At last, Raju brings out the original shade of Bhupathi and gets him arrested, but unfortunately, Tara dies in that quarrel while protecting Raju. Finally, everyone forgives Raju's past deeds and accepts him.

Cast 
N. T. Rama Rao as Raju
Vijaya Nirmala as Gowri
Satyanarayana as Bhupati & Rangoon Ranganna (dual role)
V. Nagayya as Baba
Ramakrishna as Murthy
Prabhakar Reddy as Captain Dr. Brundavanam
Allu Ramalingaiah as Senaiah
Chalam as Gopi
Mukkamala as Judge
Jyothi Lakshmi as Taara
Manimala as Janaki
Hemalatha as Lakshmamma
Malathi as Rajamma
Sachu as Radha

Soundtrack 

Music composed by T. V. Raju.

References

External links 
 

1970s action drama films
1970s Telugu-language films
Films directed by C. S. Rao
Films scored by T. V. Raju
Indian action drama films